

Events

Publications 
Thomas Brown - Lectures on the Philosophy of the Human Mind
Georg Wilhelm Friedrich Hegel - Grundlinien der Philosophie des Rechts

Births 
22 January - James Hutchison Stirling, English philosopher (died 1909)
27 April – Herbert Spencer, English philosopher and sociologist (died 1903)
23 June – , German author and philosopher (died 1897)
28 November – Friedrich Engels, German revolutionary, political economist, philosopher, industrialist, and military historian (died 1895)

Deaths 
24 March – Jean-Baptiste-René Robinet, French philosopher (born 1735)
2 April – Thomas Brown, Scottish philosopher and doctor (born 1778)
20 July – , Swedish philosopher (born 1745)

References 

Laurentiis, A, 2005, "Metaphysical Foundations of the History of Philosophy: Hegel's 1820 Introduction to the "Lectures on the History of Philosophy", The Review of Metaphysics, vol. 59, no. 1, pp. 3–31, Retrieved from https://www.jstor.org/stable/20130575?seq=1

1820
Philosophy by year
19th-century philosophy